Soutongo Louckmane Ouédraogo (born 17 October 1992) is a Burkinabé professional footballer who plays as a winger for French club CS Chaumontois.

He played for the Feyenoord Ghana academy as a youth and later played senior football in his home country with ASFA Yennenga before moving to France to join Chamois Niortais in the summer of 2012.

In 2009, Ouédraogo represented Burkina Faso at the FIFA Under-17 World Cup in Nigeria.

Club career
Ouédraogo was born in Ouagadougou, the capital of Burkina Faso. Between 2008 and 2012, Ouédraogo played at the Feyenoord Ghana football academy, the African branch of the Dutch club Feyenoord Rotterdam. In July 2012, while playing for Ouagadougou-based side ASFA Yennenga, he was offered a trial at newly promoted French Ligue 2 outfit Chamois Niortais. After impressing in several pre-season friendly matches he was signed by the club on a permanent contract. He began the season playing in the reserves before making his senior debut for Niort on 5 October 2012, coming on as a late substitute for Johan Gastien in the 0–1 defeat away at Lens. He again entered play as a substitute in the team's next match two weeks later, playing the last 15 minutes of the goalless draw with Le Havre at the Stade René Gaillard. After making a further four substitute appearance, Ouédraogo was handed the first start of his career in the final game of the 2012–13 campaign, a 1–1 draw at Clermont Foot.

For the 2013–14 season, Ouédraogo was loaned to Championnat National outfit US Boulogne in order to gain first-team experience. He went on to make 15 league appearances for the club. Upon his return to Niort ahead of the 2014–15 campaign, Ouédraogo was involved in the club's pre-season friendly matches by new manager Régis Brouard. However, he was ultimately unable to break into the first team and agreed to terminate his contract with the club by mutual consent in September 2014. He subsequently spent a period on trial at Championnat de France amateur side Beauvais, but no offer was made to the player.

Ouédraogo eventually signed for National club Istres in January 2015 following a successful trial spell. His signing was announced on the same day as that of fellow trialist Cédric Bétrémieux.

After two years with L'Entente SSG and six months with SO Cholet, he moved to Tours FC in January 2019.

International appearances
Ouédraogo was selected to represent Burkina Faso at the 2009 FIFA U-17 World Cup in Nigeria as part of a 21-man squad, and went on to score one goal in four games. He appeared as a substitute in all three of the country's Group D matches as the team progressed to the round of 16 after finishing as group runners-up behind Turkey, scoring his first international goal in the 4–1 win over Costa Rica on 31 October 2009. Ouédraogo again entered play as a substitute in the side's final game of the tournament, a 1–4 defeat to the eventual third-placed team Spain.

Career statistics

References

External links
 Louckmane Ouédraogo profile at foot-national.com 
 
 

1992 births
Living people
Sportspeople from Ouagadougou
Burkinabé footballers
Burkinabé expatriate footballers
Association football forwards
21st-century Burkinabé people
West African Football Academy players
ASFA Yennenga players
Chamois Niortais F.C. players
US Boulogne players
FC Istres players
FC Chambly Oise players
SO Cholet players
Tours FC players
FC Rouen players
Entente SSG players
Ligue 2 players
Championnat National players
Championnat National 2 players
Burkinabé expatriate sportspeople in France
Expatriate footballers in France